Stuart M. Anstis is a professor emeritus of psychology at the University of California, San Diego, in the United States.

Anstis was born in the United Kingdom. He went to Winchester, and then to Corpus Christi, Cambridge, where he did his PhD under Richard Gregory. He had teaching posts at the University of Bristol in the UK, at York University in Toronto and – from 1991 – at the University of California in San Diego, California. He is a fellow of the Society of Experimental Psychologists. In 2013, Anstis won the Kurt Koffka Medal for "advancing the field of perception ... to an extraordinary extent".

Books
George Mather, Frans Verstraten, Stuart Anstis (1998). The Motion Aftereffect: A Modern Perspective. Cambridge, Massachusetts; London: MIT Press.

References

20th-century births
Living people
English psychologists
21st-century American psychologists
People educated at Winchester College
Alumni of Corpus Christi College, Cambridge
Academics of the University of Bristol
Academic staff of York University
University of California, San Diego faculty
Fellows of the Society of Experimental Psychologists
Year of birth missing (living people)
Place of birth missing (living people)